ν Pavonis, Latinized as Nu Pavonis, is a possible triple star system in the southern constellation of Pavo. It is visible to the naked eye as a faint star that varies in apparent visual magnitude from 4.60 to 4.64 over a period of 0.85584 days. The system lies approximately 440 light years from the Sun based on parallax, and is drifting further away with a radial velocity of +17 km/s. It is a possible member of the Wolf 630 group of co-moving stars.

This is a single-lined spectroscopic binary system with an orbital period of just 1.71 days in a circular orbit. The unresolved components are close enough that their tidal interaction is significant. The visible component is a slowly pulsating B-type star with a stellar classification of B7III. This implies it is an evolved giant star, but it is actually more likely to be on the main sequence. An X-ray emission has been detected from the pair.

The third component is a visible companion, probably a pre-main-sequence star, at magnitude 13.7 and separation . This star is estimated at 0.15 solar masses and an effective temperature of 3,192 K. It too is an X-ray source.

References

B-type giants
Slowly pulsating B stars
Spectroscopic binaries

Pavo (constellation)
Pavonis, Nu
Durchmusterung objects
169978
090797
6916